Full On Night   is a collaborative EP between Rachel's and Matmos.  It was released on Quarterstick Records in May 2000 and contains two tracks.  Matmos remarks that:

"The Precise Temperature of Darkness" is a reconstruction of "Full On Night," using the original studio masters and a live version as source. The original version of "Full On Night" appeared on Rachel's album Handwriting.

Track listing
 "Full on Night" (Recension mix) – 12:31
 "The Precise Temperature of Darkness" – 18:00

Personnel
Contributors to Full On Night include:
 Christian Frederickson – viola
 Edward Grimes – drums
 Rachel Grimes – piano, organ
 Dominic Johnson – viola
 Jason Noble – guitar, tape
 Eve Miller – cello
 Drew Daniel – sampling, sequencing, digital editing
 M.C. Schmidt – bowed acoustic guitar, mixing
 Gregory King – photography

Footnotes

Rachel's albums
2003 albums
Quarterstick Records albums